Lavci is a village in the Resen Municipality of the Republic of North Macedonia, northwest of Lake Prespa. It has 134 residents as of the 2002 census.

Demographics
The village of Lavci is inhabited by Muslim Turks and Orthodox Macedonians. Lavci is one of two settlements in Resen Municipality with a Turkish majority population, the other being Kozjak.

References

Villages in Resen Municipality